The Young Avengers are the names of two superhero teams appearing in American comic books published by Marvel Comics. Created by Allan Heinberg and Jim Cheung, the first team appeared in Young Avengers #1 (April 2005). The Young Avengers team features numerous adolescent characters who typically have connections to established members of Marvel's primary superhero team, the Avengers. 

Young Avengers follows the events of the 2004–2005 "Avengers Disassembled" storyline. The four founding members of the team are gathered as a result of the Vision's plan for the reformation of the Avengers in the event the team disbanded. In the series, newspapers refer to the young heroes as "super-powered fanboys" and label them the "Young Avengers," a name the team members initially dislike but which sticks nonetheless.

Publication history 
The first team appeared in Young Avengers #1 (April 2005), created by Allan Heinberg and Jim Cheun. Marvel's 1940s forerunner, Timely Comics, had an unrelated character, Young Avenger, who debuted in USA Comics #1 (August 1941).

The Young Avengers were originally featured in a twelve issue run, later appearing in several notable Marvel crossover series, including the Civil War and The Children's Crusade events, before the series was relaunched in January 2013 as part of the Marvel NOW! rebranding by writer Kieron Gillen and artist Jamie McKelvie.

In 2019, Rio de Janeiro mayor Marcelo Crivella ordered Avengers: Children's Crusade to be censored as various instances of homosexuality such as the relationship between Hulkling and Wiccan were displayed. Crivella said the content was "improper for children". Writer Kieron Gillen was disappointed about the changes. The organizers of the Bienal do Livro book fair, where the comic was being sold, repudiated the mayor's decision and decided not to remove the book from sales. On September 6, Avengers: Children's Crusade sold out at the event.

Fictional team biography

Volume 1
In "Sidekicks" (issues #1–6), reporters Jessica Jones (a former teen superhero known as Jewel) and Kat Farrell of The Daily Bugle and heroes Captain America and Iron Man investigate a new group of teenage heroes. The story is set in the time between the "Avengers Disassembled" storyline and the beginning of New Avengers. Although the team defeats Kang the Conqueror, Captain America and Iron Man take away their gear and refuse to train the team without their parents' consent. Despite the heroes' warnings, the team continues with a new headquarters, new costumes, and new names.

In "Secret Identities" (issues #7–8), the Young Avengers must decide how much to tell their parents after the members decide to continue acting publicly. None of their parents find out. During a fight with Mr. Hyde in Young Avengers #8, Wiccan discovers Eli abusing Mutant growth hormone (MGH) which gives people powers for short periods. Eli confesses that he deceived Iron Lad who meant to recruit his missing uncle Josiah in order to join the team.  He quits the team, overwhelmed with emotion.

At the insistence of Kat Farrell, Jessica Jones interviews the Young Avengers about their pasts. Cassie Lang had a troubled home life, especially after her father Ant-Man died. She and her mother constantly fought, and she hated her mother's boyfriend. Had the Young Avengers not formed, Cassie planned to join the Runaways. Teddy Altman abused his shapeshifting powers to spend time with a more popular kid. He realized that he had gone too far when his "friend" tried to force him to steal artifacts from the destroyed Avengers Mansion. Billy Kaplan had a problem with being accepted because of his sexuality. He was tormented and physically abused. He met the Scarlet Witch, who explained that being different is not bad. He eventually stands up to his tormentor for another kid. He nearly kills him when his powers become dominant. Kate Bishop was brutally assaulted in a park. Eli Bradley used MGH because he felt powerless against some thugs and wanted to prove that his grandfather truly was the black Captain America.

K'Lrt the Super-Skrull tries to take Teddy to the Skrull homeworld. K'Lrt reveals that Mrs. Altman is not Teddy's mother and kills her. In the aftermath, K'Lrt kidnaps Teddy. The Vision offers to locate more Young Avengers using his prior incarnation's contingency plan. The Young Avengers break Thomas Shepherd out of a superhuman prison and recruit him. Tommy can move at superhuman speed and accelerate matter, destabilizing it enough to cause an explosion. The Super-Skrull tells Teddy of his true origin as the son of the Kree hero Captain Marvel and the Skrull princess Anelle. He then claims that Tommy and Billy are the Scarlet Witch and Vision's lost twin sons. Billy believes him, but Tommy does not. Kree and Skrull combat forces arrive and fight each other and the Young Avengers until Teddy, realizing his importance to both sides, calls for a ceasefire. The Avengers intervene and a Kree warrior fires at Captain America. Patriot intervenes and is gravely wounded. Hulkling and K'Lrt end the fighting by secretly shapeshifting into each other's forms. Captain America and K'Lrt, disguised as Hulkling, broker a shared custody between the races.

At a hospital, Eli's grandfather donates his blood to Eli. Captain America again tells the Young Avengers to stop what they are doing. Kate blames their trouble on the Avengers for not training them. The Young Avengers repair the statues of fallen Avengers at Avengers Mansion. Eli now has superpowers as a result of the blood transfusion. Kate receives Hawkeye's bow and quiver from Captain America, and she takes the mantle of Hawkeye. Tommy arrives in costume and calls himself Speed.

"Civil War"

In Civil War #2, the members of Young Avengers are captured by S.H.I.E.L.D. for not complying with the registration act. Captain America and the Falcon help them escape, freeing Wiccan, allowing him to teleport the group to a base only known to Nick Fury and a few resistance fighters. Once in Captain America's secret base, the Young Avengers join the resistance movement called Secret Avengers. The Young Avengers joins the fight against Iron Man and the pro-registration heroes. Stature leaves the resistance after Goliath is killed by a clone of Thor and the Secret Avengers are forced to retreat from battle leaving Wiccan behind. However, shortly afterwards Stature registers and begins superhero training. The remainder of the team remained with Captain America. Stature is seen alongside Iron Man and the rest of the "pro-reg" group during the final battle between registered and rebel heroes. Deadpool is commissioned as a "hero hunter" in the war and frequently remarks how he'd like to capture "those nubile Young Avengers".

With the surrender of Captain America, the rest of the Young Avengers are granted amnesty in exchange for registration. All the members except Hawkeye, Patriot and Speed registered, and began training at Camp Hammond. In the last issue of the Fallen Son crossover, when the funeral of Captain America takes place at Washington D.C., all of the Young Avengers are seen, wearing their Super Hero outfits, and are even mentioned by name by the Falcon, while delivering the ceremonial speech. This suggests another amnesty was offered to Hawkeye, Patriot and Speed, who had stayed in the resistance after the end of the Civil War, alongside the New Avengers.

In She-Hulk #21, it was revealed that the Hulking and Wiccan that joined the Initiative were actually a pair of interdimensional travelers known as "Alphas" whereas the actual Hulkling and Wiccan were shocked at the discovery that they had registered. Hawkeye, Patriot, and Speed, remain unregistered.

"Young Avengers Presents"
In the 2008 miniseries Young Avengers Presents, Patriot discovers that Bucky had visited his grandfather Isaiah Bradley. After tracking him down, Patriot shares his concerns losing faith in the country. Bucky explains to Eli that America is an idea used for good or ill, but one with value to it and something worth defending against all threat, inspiring the younger hero once more. Hulkling meets Mar-Vell, telling him that he is his son, much to Mar-Vell's shock. While Captain Mar-Vell is proud of his son, he confesses that he will not be able to stay forever, as the survival of the time stream depends on him eventually returning to the past and dying from cancer. This Captain Marvel eventually turned out to be a Skrull sleeper agent in place for the "Secret Invasion". Wiccan and Speed begin searching for the Scarlet Witch, whom they believe to be their mother. Upon searching the former home of the Scarlet Witch and Vision in Leonia, NJ; they encounter Master Pandemonium, who advises them to end their search and embrace their present lives. Vision tells Cassie that after "Civil War", he traveled around the world posing as different people, living many different lives, ultimately culminating in a better understanding of who he is. He asserts that he is his own person, not the memories of Iron Lad, confessing his love to Cassie, and states that he wishes to now be called Jonas. Cassie demonstrates that she is unsure but is willing to reciprocate his feelings. During the story, Cassie is also stricken with guilt after accidentally injuring her stepfather while stopping a villain, forcing her to come to terms with the responsibilities that come with her powers and with being part of the Young Avengers and the Initiative, much as her stepfather also understands the risks of life as a policeman. Hawkeye feels uncomfortable about her growing relationship with Patriot, and encounters Clint Barton, the original Hawkeye, who helps her reaffirm her position as Hawkeye and Young Avengers co-leader.

"Secret Invasion"
In the 2008 miniseries Secret Invasion: Runaways/Young Avengers, the Young Avengers again teamed with the Runaways in a Secret Invasion tie-in. The Young Avengers are the first to respond to the Skrull invasion in Manhattan, New York. They are quickly defeated, though Xavin manages to rescue Hulkling. The leaders of the Skrull invasion intend to assassinate Hulking, for fear that his identity as Dorrek VIII would diminish their authority. During the confrontation between the Young Avengers, Runaways, and the invading Skrulls, Xavin is forced to confront her former mentor, Commander Chrell, reluctantly killing him to save the Young Avengers and Runaways.

"Dark Reign"
The 2009 Dark Reign: Young Avengers limited series written by Paul Cornell, and Mark Brooks, introduced a new group consist of Enchantress, Executioner, Coat of Arms, Egghead, Big Zero and team leader Melter, who are powered teens calling themselves the Young Avengers. After Secret Invasion, all the Young Avengers remained under low profile during Norman Osborn's Dark Reign, who sent this version of Young Avengers and send them to battle only to fall against the original Young Avengers. They join forces with the genuine Young Avengers to battle Norman Osborn's Dark Avengers.

"Siege"
In the "Siege" storyline, following the attack of Asgard, Steve Rogers calls on the Young Avengers to aid in the help of Asgard against Norman Osborn's Dark Avengers and Initiative. Stature and Vision aid Amadeus Cho and U.S. Agent in stopping the Thunderbolts from stealing Odin's spear for Norman Osborn. With Patriot and Hawkeye entombed under the ruins of Asgard, Speed anxiously ferries a number of wounded Asgardians to safety, looking for his teammates. Wiccan and Hulkling take on and defeat the Wrecking Crew, who were looting the ruins of the Throne Room. Wiccan strikes the villains down with lightning bolts, much to Hulkling's wonder and worry.

Avengers: The Children's Crusade

The Young Avengers appear in the 2010–2012 miniseries, Avengers: The Children's Crusade, written by Allan Heinberg and illustrated by Jim Cheung. In the series, Magneto learned that the Young Avengers were going to search for the still missing Scarlet Witch, and that Wiccan and Speed may be the reincarnations of Wanda's children. Magneto meets them, stating that he wants Wiccan and Speed to finally know him as their grandfather, and helps them find Wanda.

The Avengers attempt to stop Magneto and fight him unsuccessfully, before Wiccan teleports Magneto and the Young Avengers to Wundagore Mountain. There they encounter Quicksilver, who attempts to kill his father. However, they discover that this Scarlet Witch is actually a Doombot in disguise, prompting the Young Avengers and Magneto to journey to Latveria, with the Avengers, Quicksilver and Wonder Man following behind them.

Wiccan eventually finds the real Wanda, apparently devoid of her powers, amnesiac and engaged to be married to Doctor Doom. Wolverine tries to kill Wanda, but is prevented from doing so by the reappearance of Iron Lad. Doom also states that Wanda is depowered. Iron Lad and the Young Avengers escape with Wanda into the timestream and land in the past when the resurrected Jack of Hearts destroys the Avengers Mansion. The team escapes the explosion and involuntarily returns to the present due to Wanda, who has remembered everything. As an unexpected side effect, the life of Scott Lang is also saved.

When the group returns to the present, Scarlet Witch is shown in a depression where she thinks that she killed her father, her brother, and the Avengers. She vows to kill herself with Kree ships and Ultron clones which Hawkeye and the Young Avengers destroy. During that time, Beast and Jessica Jones arrive, where Beast learns that the Scarlet Witch that he encountered was actually a Doombot. Wiccan tells her that her father, her brother, and "her sons" are still alive. Billy finally gets the happy Mother-and-Child Reunion that he had been dreaming of. Beast asks Wanda if she can reverse the "No more mutants" spell. She is unsure a reverse spell would work. They meet up with X-Factor Investigations, which has many clients who are depowered mutants. Rictor volunteers and has his powers restored. The X-Men show up and Wanda tells X-Factor Investigations that if the X-Men want more mutants then that's exactly what she will give them.

However, a battle ensues between the X-Men and the Avengers over what to do with Wanda, forcing her and the Young Avengers to flee back to Doctor Doom. It is revealed that Wanda's enhanced powers were a result of her and Doom's combined attempt to channel the Life Force in order to resurrect her children, but it proved to be too much for Wanda to contain and overtook her. With Wiccan and Doom's help, they seek to use the entity possessing Wanda to restore mutantkind's powers but they are stopped by Patriot (who is concerned at the fall-out that would ensue if the powerless mutants are suddenly repowered), only to find out that the entity was transferred to Doom's body, giving him Wanda's god-like powers. His scars finally healed, he calls himself "Victor", discards his now useless mask, and promises to take care of everything. Doom becomes omnipotent with powers surpassing those of beings as Beyonder or the Cosmic Cube; he offers to use these powers to fix the Avengers' and X-Men's problems and bring their deceased friends back to life, but both teams refuse the offer. The Young Avengers confront him, aided by the Avengers, the X-Men and X-Factor; Wanda and Wiccan manage to remove Doom's newfound powers, and he claims that he was responsible for the Scarlet Witch's doings during the "Avengers Disassembled" and "House of M" events (later established to have been lying on Wanda's behalf, and the Scarlet Witch to have been solely responsible). During the confrontation Stature attacks Doom, who responds by blasting her with a wave of energy. After Wanda and Wiccan successfully remove the powers from Doom he escapes. The last panel of issue 8 ends with the heroes surrounding Stature's stricken form.

Following the battle with Doom, Stature is revealed to have died from her injuries. Iron Lad offers to save Stature by taking her into the timestream. Vision objects to this, making Iron Lad enraged with him. Iron Lad attacks him, resulting in Vision's destruction. Iron Lad then prepared to jump into the timestream to go back and save Stature, with Wiccan warning him that this is the moment he becomes Kang the Conqueror, but Iron Lad is not deterred. With the battles over, all that was left was to determine the fate of the Scarlet Witch. Cyclops agrees to leave the Scarlet Witch alone, but states that he will kill Wanda if she turns against the heroes again. Rejecting the offer to rejoin the Avengers or her family, Wanda departs stating that after years of defining herself as Magneto's daughter, Pietro's sister, or the Vision's wife, she wants to find out who she is on her own before she decides what to do with her life. Later the Young Avengers decide to disband, much to the disapproval of Speed.  Months pass by with the events of Spider-Island, Schism, and the Human Torch's revival having occurred and the Young Avengers taking no action. All this time Wiccan was in a depressive state. Hulkling tries to get him to talk to someone, but Wiccan refuses. Wiccan then believes Hulkling is breaking up with him, leading Hulkling to make an impromptu "proposal". They kiss, but are interrupted by Ms. Marvel and told to get into uniform and go to the mansion.  The issue ends with the Young Avengers officially being recognized as full-fledged Avengers.

Volume 2
A new Young Avengers series, written by Kieron Gillen and drawn by Jamie McKelvie, was launched in January 2013 as part of the Marvel NOW! rebranding campaign. The new monthly series reintroduces existing Young Avengers, Wiccan, Hulkling and Hawkeye, as well as introducing Kid Loki, Noh-Varr and America Chavez to the book's cast. The series' sixth issue included the reintroduction of former Young Avenger, Speed, and the addition of depowered mutant Prodigy to the group. Over the course of the series, Wiccan and Hulkling reaffirm their commitment to one another after Hulkling faces an existential crisis; Wiccan discovers that he will one day become the all-powerful Demiurge; Prodigy comes out as bisexual, and develops a crush on Hulkling; Kate and Noh-Varr become a couple, and then later break up after Noh-Varr realises he doesn't feel as strongly for Kate as he does for his ex, Oubliette; and America Chavez is revealed to be from a paradise dimension created by the Demiurge (Wiccan). In the latter half of the series, Kid Loki believes he is engaged in a battle of wits with against his ex, Leah. However, he later uncovers that this 'Leah' is in fact a projection of his own guilty conscience, which wants to restore Loki to his true self. After tricking Wiccan into transforming him to a more mature form—that of a late teenager or young adult—he departs the group, choosing to do so before they can forgive him for manipulating and betraying them. Throughout the story, the group are also haunted by a powerful character dressed as Patriot, who captures Tommy. In the concluding issue of the series, Prodigy rightly surmises that this Patriot is a member of the team who has been transformed into a non-human in some future magical event, and is now echoing backwards along the timeline in order to ensure this future comes to pass. Guessing this person may well be himself, he kisses the Patriot, causing the Patriot to vanish and Tommy to reappear. Volume 2 came to an end with issue #15, as Gillen and McKelvie wrapped up their story and wanted to pursue other collaborations.

Thus the team again disbanded, after Hawkeye, America Chavez, and Noh-Varr joined West Coast Avengers, Wiccan and Speed focusing their relationships with Hulkling and Prodigy respectively.

Members

Recurring characters

Vol. 1
 Kat Farrell
 Kang the Conqueror
 Jessica Jones
 New Avengers
 Kl'rt the Super Skrull

Vol. 2
 Uncanny Avengers
 Leah of Hel
 Thin Spandex Line

Reception

Accolades 

 In 2019, Screen Rant included the Young Avengers in their "10 Strongest Avengers Teams" list.
 In 2022, CBR.com ranked the Young Avengers 6th in their "10 Marvel Teams That Exceeded Expectations" list.

Literary reception

Volumes 
The Young Avengers comic book series won the 2006 Harvey Award for Best New Series. It won the 2006 and 2014 GLAAD Media Awards for Outstanding Comic Book.

Young Avengers Presents - 2008 
According to Diamond Comic Distributors, Young Avengers Presents #1 was the 44th best selling comic book in January 2008.

Bryan Joel of IGN gave Young Avengers Presents #1 a grade of 8 out of 10, saying, "Paco Medina lends his pencils to this issue and while I've never been the biggest fan of his work, this might be the best and most polished I've ever seen it. His oddly-proportioned faces pop up here and there but his Patriot is uniformly great-looking, which is the most important part. I have a feeling we won't be getting any answers to the big questions from Young Avengers Presents, like status quo and membership post-Civil War, but when the proper series does eventually start up again, fans will probably have a heightened appreciation for its stars."

Young Avengers - 2013 
According to Diamond Comic Distributors, Young Avengers #1 was the 18th best selling comic book in January 2013.

Kelly Thompson of CBR.com called Young Avengers #1 "incredibly satisfying, innovative and touching," asserting, "There's such passion and even conviction in what Gillen and McKelvie are doing on this book. It's easy feel the love and care on these pages, which is something mainstream comics don't have nearly enough of. With books like "Young Avengers" leading the pack, Marvel NOW! is shaping up to be one hell of an interesting line." Marc Buxton of Den of Geek gave Young Avengers #1 a grade of 10 out of 10, writing, "So, if you’re one of those readers who complain that they have seen it all before and that mainstream comics have become predictable, you owe it to yourself to experience Young Avengers. This is the book that will define the craft for generations to come, and Marvel deserves credit for seeing the potential the creative team has with these characters. Gillen and McKelvie are clearly worthy of the legacy that is Young Avengers."

Other versions

What If?
In 2008, a story titled "What If the Runaways Became the Young Avengers?" ran as a back-up story through five What If? issues. The feature illustrates what would have happened if Iron Lad never found out about the Avengers Fail-Safe Program. Instead, he recruits the Runaways, forcing them to be an actual superhero team with costumes. Although it is later revealed that the Iron Lad that brought them together was actually Victor Mancha—Iron Lad ran into Victor's future self when attempting to flee to the Avengers' era, with Victorious travelling back with him and using Victor to hi-jack his equipment—Kang's attempt to rescue his younger self results in Iron Lad being killed and Kang being erased from history while Victor destroys his future self and departs via Kang's time-belt to find his own way, leaving the Runaways to continue as Young Avengers with Chase now using parts of the Iron Lad armor. It was written by C.B. Cebulski, and drawn by Patrick "Spaz" Spaziante.

In other media

Marvel Cinematic Universe
Following the individual introductions of multiple Young Avengers members from the comics in the Marvel Cinematic Universe (MCU), media outlets speculated that Marvel Studios was building towards a team-up film or series based on the Young Avengers. Speaking about the possibility of this, Marvel Studios president Kevin Feige said with the new characters being introduced in Phase Four, "the potential [was] endless". Elizabeth Olsen, who portrays Wanda Maximoff in the franchise, stated that she had "no idea" of any plans for such a project, although she believed that it "could be a possibility".

Appearances of Young Avengers members 
Several Young Avengers members have appeared in various films and television series set in the MCU:

 Cassandra Lang / Stature: 
 Portrayed by Abby Ryder Fortson as a child in Ant-Man (2015) and Ant-Man and the Wasp (2018).
 Portrayed by Emma Fuhrmann as a teen in Avengers: Endgame (2019).
 Portrayed by Kathryn Newton as a young adult in Ant-Man and the Wasp: Quantumania (2023).
 Billy and Tommy Maximoff:
 Respectively portrayed by Julian Hilliard and Jett Klyne in the TV series WandaVision (2021) and as their Earth-838 counterparts in the film Doctor Strange in the Multiverse of Madness (2022).
 Elijah Bradley:
 Portrayed by Elijah Richardson in three episodes of the TV series The Falcon and the Winter Soldier (2021).
 Kid Loki:
 Portrayed by Jack Veal as a "variant" of the original Loki during the first season of the TV series Loki (2021).
 Kate Bishop / Hawkeye:
 Portrayed by Hailee Steinfeld in the TV series Hawkeye (2021).
 America Chavez:
 Portrayed by Xochitl Gomez in Doctor Strange in the Multiverse of Madness (2022).

Video games 

 The Young Avengers appear as unlockable playable characters in Lego Marvel's Avengers. The members featured are Kate Bishop, Hulking, Wiccan, Speed, and America Chavez.

Collected editions 
The stories have been collected into a number of volumes:

Allen Heinberg and Jim Cheung

Notes
Members of Thin Spandex Line:
Ahura Boltagon
Alpha (Andy Maguire),
Anole (Vic Borkowski)
Armor (Hisako Ichiki)
Batwing (James Santini)
Blindfold (Ruth Aldine)
Bling! (Roxy Washington)
Broo
Butterball (Emery Schaub)
Cloud 9 (Abby Boylen)
Crosta
Dust (Sooraya Qadir)
Eye Boy (Trevor Hawkins)
Ernst
Finesse (Jeanne Foucault)
Genesis (Evan Sabahnur)
Gentle (Nezhno Abidemi)
Gravity (Greg Willis)
Indra (Paras Gavaskar)
Hawkeye (Kate Bishop)
Hellion (Julian Keller)
Hulkling (Teddy Altman)
Lightspeed (Julie Powers)
Jolt (Helen Takahama)
Karolina Dean
Kid Gladiator (Kubark)
Kid Omega (Quentin Quire)
Kid Loki
Match (Ben Hammil)
Mercury (Cessily Kincaid)
America Chavez
No-Girl (Martha Johansson)
Marvel-Boy (Noh-Varr)
Power Man (Victor Alvarez)
Pixie (Megan Gwynn)
Primal (Teon Macik)
Prodigy (David Alleyne)
Oya (Idie Okonkwo)
Rage (Elvin Haliday)
Rockslide (Santo Vaccarro)
Scorpion (Carmilla Black)
Shark-Girl (Iara Dos Santos)
She-Hulk (Lyra)
Skaar
Speed (Tommy Shepherd)
Spider-Girl (Anya Corazon)
Sprite (Jia Jing)
Striker (Brandon Sharpe)
Surge (Noriko Ashida)
Thunderstrike (Kevin Masterson)
Toro (Benito Serrano)
Trance (Hope Abbott)
Transonic (Laurie Tromette)
Troll (Gunna Sijurvald)
Velocidad (Gabriel Cohuelo)
Wiz Kid (Taki Matsuya)
Ultragirl (Tsu-Zana)
White Tiger (Ava Ayala)
Wiccan (Billy Kaplan)
Zero-G (Alex Power)

References

External links

 Young Avengers at the Marvel Universe
 
 

GLAAD Media Award for Outstanding Comic Book winners
2005 comics debuts
Avengers (comics) titles
Marvel Next
Harvey Award winners for Best New Series
Marvel Comics superhero teams
LGBT-related comics
Teenage superheroes